Giulia Quintavalle (born March 6, 1983, in Livorno) is an Italian judoka. She won the gold medal in the -57 kg weight class at the 2008 Summer Olympics.

Palmarès
Olympic Games
Gold 2008 Beijing
Gold Vienna 2010 (squadre)

Mediterranean Games
Bronze Almeria 2005

National Judo Championship
Gold 3 times national champion absolute (2004-2005-2006)

Other international events
Bronze Lione 2002
Silver Coimbra 2002
Bronze Tunisi 2007
Silver Mosca 2007
Silver Lido di Roma 2008
Bronze Abu Dhabi 2009
Bronze Varsavia 2010
Silver Abu Dhabi 2010
Bronze GP Düsseldorf 2011
Gold WCF Lisbona 2011
Gold Roma World Cup 2011
Gold Abu Dhabi 2011

External links

 
 
 
 

1983 births
Living people
Italian female judoka
Judoka at the 2008 Summer Olympics
Judoka at the 2012 Summer Olympics
Olympic judoka of Italy
Olympic gold medalists for Italy
Sportspeople from Livorno
Judoka of Fiamme Gialle
Olympic medalists in judo
Medalists at the 2008 Summer Olympics
European Games bronze medalists for Italy
European Games medalists in judo
Judoka at the 2015 European Games
Mediterranean Games bronze medalists for Italy
Mediterranean Games medalists in judo
Competitors at the 2005 Mediterranean Games
21st-century Italian women